Marché du Niger (Nigerian market) is a market in Conakry, Guinea, slightly smaller than the other main market in the city, Marché Madina. It sells fruit and vegetables and according to Lonely Planet has a problem with pickpocketing.

See also
List of buildings and structures in Guinea

References

Retail markets in Guinea
Buildings and structures in Conakry